Mohamad Mido is a Syrian footballer who plays for El Dakhleya in Egypt. His younger brother Hamid Mido plays for Al-Minaa.

References

External links
 Profile at Goalzz.com

Living people
1990 births
Syrian footballers
Syrian expatriate footballers
Expatriate footballers in Lebanon
Expatriate footballers in Yemen
Syrian expatriate sportspeople in Lebanon
Sportspeople from Aleppo
Association football midfielders
Syrian Premier League players
Al Mabarra Club players
Lebanese Premier League players